Fábio Gonçalves (born 19 November 1986), commonly known as Fabinho, is a Brazilian footballer who plays for Sport Recife, on loan from Botafogo as a defensive midfielder.

Club career
Born in Cruzeiro, São Paulo, Fabinho made his senior debuts with Camboriú in 2006, aged 20. In 2009, he moved to Campinense, and subsequently represented Baraúnas and Alecrim before joining América-RN in September 2011.

Fabinho was promoted with the latter to Série B late in the year, after appearing in four matches. He made his debut in the competition on 19 May 2012, starting in a 5–2 home routing of Goiás.

Fabinho was an undisputed starter for his side during the following years, scoring his first goal for the club on 20 January 2013, netting his side's only in a 1–2 home loss against Vitória, for that year's Copa do Nordeste. On 22 December 2014 he signed for Série A club Figueirense.

Fabinho has appeared in over 100 competitive matches for Ceará over three seasons and winning the 2020 Copa do Nordeste with the club.

Honours
América-RN
Campeonato Potiguar: 2012, 2014

Internacional
Campeonato Gaúcho: 2016

Ceará
Copa do Nordeste: 2020

References

External links

1986 births
Living people
Footballers from São Paulo (state)
Brazilian footballers
Association football midfielders
Campeonato Brasileiro Série A players
Campeonato Brasileiro Série B players
Campeonato Brasileiro Série C players
Campeonato Brasileiro Série D players
Camboriú Futebol Clube players
Campinense Clube players
Associação Cultural Esporte Clube Baraúnas players
Alecrim Futebol Clube players
América Futebol Clube (RN) players
Figueirense FC players
Sport Club Internacional players
Ceará Sporting Club players
Botafogo de Futebol e Regatas players
Sport Club do Recife players
People from Cruzeiro, São Paulo